Republika is a weekly newspaper from North Macedonia. Publishing began in 2012. In 2017, the print edition was shut down due to financial problems, but the publication has continued online.

The magazine is reported to be supportive of former Prime Minister Nikola Gruevski of the VMRO-DPMNE party and to be owned by a company linked to Peter Schatz, a Hungarian media tycoon closely allied with Hungarian Prime Minister Viktor Orbán, similar to TV station Alfa TV. It has been criticized by the civic fact-checking organization F2N2 for unverified sensationalist articles that promoted conspiracies involving Gruevski's rival, Zoran Zaev. As well as George Soros who is disliked by the Viktor Orban regime.

Ownership 
The newspaper was originally launched in 2012 by a company called Iresine Ltd. which was registered in the tax haven of Belize, with ownership of the company being unknown. In 2016, ownership of the company was transferred to Done Donevski.

Since 2017, the holding company First republika Dooel Skopje which owns the Republika newspaper has been majority owned by a Hungarian media company called Adinamic Media. Which according to some observers has links to Viktor Orban. Due to the owner of Adinmaic Media being Agnes Adamik (also known by her new name Agnes Kovacs), who was an employee of the Hungarian state broadcaster.

References

External links
 Official page

Newspapers published in North Macedonia
Macedonian-language newspapers
Propaganda in North Macedonia